The Raoellidae, previously grouped within Helohyidae, are an extinct family of semiaquatic digitigrade artiodactyls in the clade Whippomorpha. Fossils of raoellids are found in Eocene strata of South and Southeast Asia.

An exceptionally complete skeleton of Indohyus from Kashmir suggests that raoellids are the "missing link" sister group to whales (Cetacea). All other Artiodactyla are relatives of these two groups. δO18 values and osteosclerotic bones indicate that the raccoon-like Indohyus was habitually aquatic. However, it is still unclear if Indohyus primarily fed on land or in water. It is hypothesized that Cetaceans evolved from ancestors similar to Indohyus and later fully adapted to aquatic life.

Taxonomy
Raoella
Raoella dograi
Haqueina
Haqueina haquei
Indohyus
Indohyus indirae
Indohyus major
Kunmunella
Kunmunella kalakotensis
Kunmunella transversa
Metkatius
Metkatius kashmiriensis
Khirtharia
Khirtharia aurea
Khirtharia dayi
Khirtharia inflatus

References

Further reading

 
 
 
 
 
 
 

Eocene even-toed ungulates
Prehistoric mammals of Asia
Eocene first appearances
Eocene extinctions
Prehistoric mammal families